Carl Johannes Thomae (sometimes called Johannes Thomae, Karl Johannes Thomae, or Johannes Karl Thomae; 11 December 1840 in Laucha an der Unstrut – 1 April 1921 in Jena) was a German mathematician.

Biography
Thomae, son of Karl August Thomae (head master) and Emilie Gutsmuths, grew up in Laucha an der Unstrut and in 1864 attained a doctorate under Ernst Schering at the University of Göttingen. In 1866 Thomae attained the habilitation qualification at the University of Göttingen and one year later in the year 1867 at the University of Halle. In the year 1874 Thomae married Anna Uhde in Balgstädt in the proximity of his native city Laucha an der Unstrut. Their son Walter Thomae was born one year later on 5 November 1875, but Thomae's wife died 5 days after giving birth. In 1879 Thomae became ordentliche professor at the University of Jena. In 1892 he married his second wife Sophie Pröpper in Jena. One year later was born Susanne Thomae. In 1914 Thomae, at that time dean of the philosophical faculty at the University of Jena, retired. In 1921 he died in Jena after a short illness. Carl Johannes Thomae's research was concerned with function theory and with what German-speaking mathematicians often call "Epsilontik", the precise development of analysis, differential geometry, and topology using epsilon-neighborhoods in the style of Weierstrass. The Thomae function, the Thomae transformation formula (aka, Thomae's transformation and Thomae's theorem), the Thomae formula for hyperelliptic curves, and the Sears–Thomae transformation formula are named after him. He called himself Riemann's student, although he never attended a lecture by Riemann.

Works

 Elementare Theorie der analytischen Funktionen einer komplexen Veränderlichen. Nebert, Halle (Saale) 1880.

References

External links
 Leben und Werke von Carl Johannes Thomae
 Thomae im Catalogus Professorum Halensis
 
 
 

19th-century German mathematicians
1840 births
1921 deaths
People from Laucha an der Unstrut
University of Göttingen alumni
University of Halle alumni
Academic staff of the University of Jena
20th-century German mathematicians